Innachori is a group of villages and a former municipality in the Chania regional unit, Crete, Greece. Since the 2011 local government reform, it is part of the municipality Kissamos, which is a municipal unit. The name means 'nine villages'. It is a shady, hilly area in the southwest of the island.

Innachori is rugged and remote and known for its chestnuts. It is increasingly popular with tourists, particularly the white sand beach and warm shallow waters at Elafonisi.

The seat of the municipality was Elos. Settlements of the Innachori include:
Elos
Perivolia
Kefali
Vathi
Kampos
Strovles
Vlatos
Amygdalokefali
Chrysoskalitissa

References

See also
List of settlements in the Chania regional unit

Populated places in Chania (regional unit)